A faun is a half-human, half-goat creature in Roman mythology.

Faun may also refer to:

Tadano Faun GmbH, a German engineering firm
Faun (band), a German pagan folk / medieval band
Faunis, a genus of Asian butterflies commonly referred to as the fauns
Faun (film), a Hungarian silent film directed by Alexander Korda
The Faun, a sculpture
The Faun, ballet composed by Dora Bright
The Faun, play by Edward Knoblock

See also
 Fawn (disambiguation)
 Fun (disambiguation)
 Fon (disambiguation)